Skate Israel was a senior-level international figure skating competition, held in Metulla, Israel. Medals were awarded in four disciplines: men's singles, ladies' singles, pair skating, and ice dancing.

First organized in 1995, Skate Israel was held annually through 2000. The 2002 competition was cancelled due to political uncertainty. The event returned in 2003 and was last held in 2005. Israeli skaters Galit Chait / Sergei Sakhnovsky, who competed in all eight editions, won the ice dance title six times. Roman Serov won the men's singles title four times, twice representing Russia and twice representing Israel.

Medalists

Men

Ladies

Pairs

Ice dancing

References

 
Skate Israel
International sports competitions hosted by Israel
Figure skating in Israel